Fifteen-Love is an upcoming British drama television series created by Hania Elkington and World Productions, starring Aidan Turner and Ella Lily Hyland, for Amazon Prime Video.

Synopsis
A former tennis prodigy makes an explosive allegation against her former coach with whom she reached a semi-final at the French Open. Five years on from a bad injury she has entered therapy with a new psychologist whilst he is still coaching a new prospect.

Cast

Production
In May 2022, it was revealed Amazon Prime had greenlit Fifteen-Love, a six-part series created by Hania Elkington, who acts as scriptwriter and executive producer. The show is produced by World Productions and directed by Eva Riley for the first three episodes and Toby MacDonald the latter three. The series is produced by Natasha Romaniuk. 

Elkington said of the project’s theme "Writing this drama…has been revelatory. I hope that Fifteen-Love has the same effect on its audience, and can become another valuable part of this urgent, emerging story."

In August 2022, it was announced Aidan Turner and Ella Lily Hyland would star in the series. Also joining the cast were Anna Chancellor, Jessica Darrow, Tom Varey, Lorenzo Richelmy, Manon Azem, Elizabeth Berrington, Amar Chadha-Patel, Steffan Rhodri, as well as Maria Margarida Almeida and Harmony Rose-Bremner.

Ella Lily Hyland trained for the tennis scenes and was helped on set by tennis coach and former-pro Naomi Cavaday.

Broadcast
The series is expected to air on Amazon Prime Video in 2023.

References

External links

2023 British television series debuts
2023 British television series endings
2020s British drama television series
2020s British television miniseries
Upcoming television series
English-language television shows
Television shows filmed in England